Basilisk is an anime television series based on the manga series of the same title written and illustrated by Masaki Segawa. The series first premiered in Japan between April and September 2005. It has also been aired across numerous international regions. On July 19, 2017, it was announced that Yamada's sequel, Basilisk: The Ōka Ninja Scrolls was green-lit for an anime and premiered on January 8, 2018. The series uses five musical themes: two openings and three ending theme songs. For season one, the opening theme is Kouga Ninpou Chou by Onmyo-Za while the ending themes for the first fourteen episodes are "Hime Murasaki" by Nana Mizuki and "Wild Eyes" by Nana Mizuki. For season two, the opening theme is "Ōka Ninpōchō" by Onmyo-Za while the ending theme is "Hot Blood" by Nana Mizuki.

Episode list

Basilisk: Kōga Ninpō Chō (2005)
The story takes place in the year 1614.  Two ninja clans, Tsubagakure of the Iga and Manjidani of Kouga, battle each other to determine which grandson of Tokugawa Ieyasu will become the next shogun.  The deadly competition between 10 elite ninja from each clan unleashes a centuries-old hatred that threatens to destroy all hope for peace between them.

Basilisk: Ōka Ninpō Chō (2018)
It is 1626 in the Kan'ei era, ten years after the fight for succession of the shogun, which pitted the Kouga and Iga ninja clans against each other.

References

Basilisk